Raymond Guiot (born 5 October 1930) is a French flautist, pianist and composer. He has also trained many flutists throughout the world.

Biography 

Guiot entered the Conservatoire de Roubaix at the age of 7, pushed by a father in love with classical music. In 1947, after two years in Marcel Moyse's class, he won first prize at the Conservatoire de Paris. A few months later, he joined the Opéra de Lille as piccolo under the direction of conductors Fernand Oubradous and Georges Prêtre. There he learned his trade for three consecutive years, playing many operas, operettas and lyrical comedies.

He then taught flute at the École nationale de musique de Calais from 1950 to 1956. It was at this time that he prepared - alone - the Geneva competition, of which he won the first prize in 1954.

In 1956, the French Republican Guard Band of Paris gave him the opportunity to leave Calais. He then started to work a lot for the Parisian recording studios.

First flute at the Opéra de Paris from 1962 to 1991, he also became assistant to Alain Marion at the Conservatoire de Paris in 1977.

Compositions 
His compositions are based on classical forms and borrow certain elements from jazz.

Discography

Albums 
These albums were mostly made for music illustration labels; they are not albums in the traditional sense of the term, i.e. records sold commercially and distributed in the media. See production music.
 1965: Raymond Guiot - Bach Street
 1965: Raymond Guiot - Haendel with care
 1966: Raymond Guiot and his orchestra - Boum Bomo
 1968: Raymond Guiot - Scarlatti Sounds, (LP)  TM 3000
 1970: Raymond Guiot - Jazz Baroque Quintet, (LP) Tele Music TM 3003
 1971: Raymond Guiot plays Domenico Scarlatti
 1972: Raymond Guiot - Néo-Classiques, (LP) Tele Music TM 3025
 1973: Raymond Guiot - Jazz Panorama, (LP) Tele Music TM 3031
 1974: Raymond Guiot - Instruments à vents, vol. 2, (LP) Tele Music TM 3036
 1974: Raymond Guiot - Flûtes & Harpes, (LP) Tele Music TM 3039
 1975: Raymond Guiot - Indicatifs, (LP) Tele Music TM 3042
 1975: Raymond Guiot - Flûtes & Guitares, (LP) Tele Music 3054
 1976: Raymond Guiot - Basse contre Basse, (LP) Tele Music TM 3059
 1978: Raymond Guiot - Baronne baroque
 197?: Raymond Guiot - I like Johann Sebastien
 1983: Raymond Guiot - Néo-Classiques, vol. 2, (LP) Tele Music TM 3088
 1985: Raymond Guiot - Air Generation, (LP) Tele Music 3101

In collaboration

With Guy Pedersen 
 1970: Raymond Guiot & Guy Pedersen - Indian pop bass, (LP) Tele Music TM 709
 1970: Raymond Guiot & Guy Pedersen - Contrebasses, (LP) Tele Music TM 3014
 1971: Raymond Guiot & Guy Pedersen - Musique en Vrac, (LP) Tele Music TM 3017

Others 
 1970: Raymond Guiot & Maurice Plessac - Flute & Hapsichord, (LP) Tele Music TM 3011
 1971: Raymond Guiot & R. Auteloup - Instruments à vent, vol.1, (LP) Tele Music TM 3020
 1973: Raymond Guiot & Pierre Bachelet - Pianos romantiques, (LP) Tele Music TM 3024
 1988: Raymond Guiot & Alain Marion - Golden Flute Club

Original Film Scores 
Guiot participated as a musician, he did not compose the music.
 1957: Henri Crolla / Hubert Rostaing / André Hodeir - La Parisienne (film by Michel Boisrond)
 1959: Alain Goraguer -  (film by ) 
 1959: Serge Gainsbourg / Alain Goraguer -  (film by Hervé Bromberger)
 1967: François de Roubaix - Le Samouraï (film by Jean-Pierre Melville)
 1968: Vladimir Cosma - Very Happy Alexander (film by Yves Robert)
 1969: Vladimir Cosma - Clérambard (film by Yves Robert)
 1970: Eric Demarsan - Le Cercle rouge (film by Jean-Pierre Melville)

Albums as studio musician 
A very important part of Raymond Guiot's musical activity consisted of recording for the French music world in the 1960s and 1970s, but the musicians were then only rarely credited.

Albums as "Sideman" 
 1960: André Hodeir - Jazz & Jazz
 1962: Elek Bacsik - Bossa Nova (EP)
 1969: Le Monde Musical de Baden Powell, volume 2
 1970: Claude Ciari and The Batucada Seven
 1971: Baden Powell
 1973: Maxime Saury - Blue and Sentimental
 1977: Baden Powell Canta Vinicus de Moraes e Paolo Cesar Pinheiro
 1982 : April orchestra - Duty Free, (LP) APR 45
 198? : April Orchestra - Mélodies de Cour

Compositions by Raymond Guiot on CD 
 Sandrine François - Bluesy Prelude, (Hybrid Music, 2008)
 Flautissimo vol.29, Hommage à Raymond Guiot

References

External links 
 Discography (Discogs)
 Raymond Guyot
 Improvisation - Raymond Guiot (YouTube)

1930 births
People from Roubaix
French classical flautists
20th-century French composers
Conservatoire de Paris alumni
Living people
20th-century flautists